MI10, or Military Intelligence, section 10, was a department of the British Directorate of Military Intelligence, part of  the War Office. It was responsible for weapons and technical analysis during World War II.

The group was merged into MI16 (scientific and technical intelligence) when the latter was created near the end of the war, and MI10 became the section responsible for road intelligence.

Reference

External links
What happened to MI1 - MI4? MI5 FAQ

Groups of World War II
Security
Defunct United Kingdom intelligence agencies
Military communications of the United Kingdom
War Office in World War II
British intelligence services of World War II